Freedom Tower - No Wave Dance Party 2015 is the tenth and final studio album by American punk blues band Jon Spencer Blues Explosion, released in 2015.

Track listing
"Funeral" – 2:34
"Wax Dummy" – 3:09
"Do The Get Down" – 2:49
"Betty Vs The NYPD" – 1:52
"White Jesus" - 1:39
"Born Bad" - 2:44
"Down And Out" - 2:37
"Crossroad Hop" - 4:01
"The Ballad Of Joe Buck" - 1:42
"Dial Up Doll" - 2:52
"Bellevue Baby" - 3:32
"Tales Of Old New York: The Rock Box" - 2:12
"Cooking For Television" - 2:43

References 

2015 albums
Jon Spencer Blues Explosion albums